Yolanda del Carmen Montecinos Pineda (December 12, 1927 – September 7, 2007) was a Chilean journalist, writer, and television commentator.

2007 deaths
Deaths from Alzheimer's disease
Deaths from dementia in Chile
1927 births
Chilean women journalists
Chilean women writers